A blucher ( or ,) is a style of shoe with open lacing, its vamp made of a single piece of leather ("one cut"), with shoelace eyelets tabs sewn on top.

The blucher is similar to a derby: both feature open lacing, in contrast to the Oxford shoe, which uses closed lacing, but in the derby the upper has large quarters with eyelets sewn on top, while in the blucher the upper is made of one cut, with only the small eyelet tabs sewn on top. In American English these terms are sometimes confused, with "blucher" also being used to refer to derby shoes, and "Oxford" also being used to refer to bluchers.

The blucher is named after the 18th century Prussian field marshal Gebhard Leberecht von Blücher. General von Blücher commissioned a boot with side pieces lapped over the front in an effort to provide his troops with improved footwear. This design was adopted by armies across Europe.

References

Shoes